Lactuca viminea, the pliant lettuce, is a Eurasian plant species in the tribe Cichorieae within the family Asteraceae. It is widespread across much of Europe and southwestern Asia from Portugal to Pakistan.

Lactuca viminea is a branching subshrub up to 30 cm tall. Leaves near the base are pinnately lobed, but the leaves on the stem are narrow and linear, not lobed, becoming smaller farther up the plant. The uppermost leaves are pressed against the stem and almost scale-like. Flower heads have 4–5 yellow ray flowers but no disc flowers.

Subspecies
Lactuca viminea subsp. chondrilliflora (Boreau) St.-Lag.
Lactuca viminea subsp. ramosissima (All.) Arcang.
Lactuca viminea subsp. viminea

References

viminea
Flora of Europe
Flora of Asia
Plants described in 1753
Taxa named by Carl Linnaeus